Thank You for the Music (subtitled A Collection of Love Songs) is a compilation album by Swedish pop group ABBA. It was released in November 1983 in the United Kingdom by the record company Epic. The compilation features 14 tracks, including the singles "I Have a Dream", "Chiquitita" and "The Day Before You Came". It also contains the Spanish version of "Fernando", which was the first time this version was released in the UK.

The album peaked at No. 17 on the UK Albums Chart, breaking ABBA's run of eight consecutive UK number-one albums from Greatest Hits in 1976 to The Singles: The First Ten Years in 1982. It was certified gold for sales of over 100,000 units. The song "Thank You for the Music" was released as a single in the UK in November 1983 with the Super Trouper album track "Our Last Summer" (also on this compilation) as the B-side. The single peaked at No. 33.

Track listing
Side A

Side B

References

External links 
 

ABBA compilation albums
1983 compilation albums
Epic Records compilation albums